The 21st Legislative Assembly of Quebec was the provincial legislature in Quebec, Canada that existed from October 25, 1939, to August 8, 1944. The Quebec Liberal Party led by Adélard Godbout was the governing party. It was the last term for the Liberals in power until 1960. The Union Nationale were in power for the following four terms.

Seats per political party

 After the 1939 elections

Member list

This was the list of members of the Legislative Assembly of Quebec that were elected in the 1939 election:

Other elected MLAs

Other MLAs were elected in by-elections during this term

 Joseph-Tancrède Labbé, Union Nationale, Mégantic, November 19, 1940 
 Damase Perrier, Quebec Liberal Party, Terrebonne, November 19, 1940 
 Dennis James O'Connor, Quebec Liberal Party, Huntingdon, October 6, 1941 
 Jean-Paul Beaulieu, Union Nationale, Saint-Jean-Napierville, October 6, 1941 
 Thomas Guérin, Quebec Liberal Party, Montréal-Sainte-Anne, March 23, 1942 
 Claude Jodoin, Quebec Liberal Party, Montréal-Saint-Jacques, March 23, 1942 
 Joseph-Willie Robidoux, Quebec Liberal Party, Richelieu-Verchères, March 23, 1942 
 George Carlyle Marler, Quebec Liberal Party, Westmount-Saint-Georges, March 23, 1942

Cabinet Ministers

 Prime Minister and Executive Council President: Adélard Godbout
 Agriculture: Adélard Godbout
 Colonization: Adélard Godbout (1939-1942), Cléophas Bastien (1942-1944)
 Labour: Edgar Rochette
 Public Works: Télesphore-Damien Bouchard (1939-1942), Georges-Étienne Dansereau (1942-1944)
 Health: Henri Groulx (1939-1941)
 Social Welfare: Henri Groulx (1940-1941)
 Health and Social Welfare:Henri Groulx (1941-1944)
 Lands, Forests, Hunting and Fishing: Pierre-Émile Côté (1939-1941)
 Lands and Forests: Pierre-Émile Côté (1941-1942), Wilfrid Hamel (1942-1944)
 Hunting and Fishing: Pierre-Émile Côté (1941-1942), Valmore Bienvenue (1942-1944)
 Mines and Fisheries: Edgar Rochette (1939-1941)
 Mines and coastal fisheries: Edgar Rochette (1941-1942)
 Mines: Edgar Rochette (1942-1944)
 Roads: Télesphore-Damien Bouchard (1939-1944), Georges-Étienne Dansereau (1944)
 Municipal Affairs, Industry and Commerce: Oscar Drouin (1939-1944), Henri-René Renault (1944)
 Attorney General: Wilfrid Girouard (1939-1942), Léon Casgrain (1942-1944)
 Provincial Secretary: Henri Groulx (1939-1940), Hector Perrier (1940-1944)
 Treasurer: James Arthur Matthewson
 Members without portfolios: Frank Lawrence Connors, Georges-Étienne Dansereau (1939-1942), Léon Casgrain (1939-1942), Louis-Joseph Thisdel, Cléophas Bastien (1939-1942), Wilfrid Hamel (1939-1942), Francois-Philippe Brais (1940-1944), Perrault Casgrain (1942-1944), Henri-René Renault (1942-1944), Joseph-Achille Francoeur (1944), Maurice Gingues (1944)

New electoral districts

The electoral map was reformed in 1944 which was used in the upcoming election later that year. Some of the changes included de-mergers of ridings that were created in the previous reform in 1939. 

 Abitibi was split into two ned ridings: Abitibi-Ouest and Abitibi-Est.
 Rouyn-Noranda was formed from parts of Témiscamingue.
 The riding of Napierville-Laprairie was recreated after Châteauguay and Laprairie were de-merged as well as Saint-Jean and Napierville which formed Saint-Jean-Napierville in 1939. Châteauguay and Saint-Jean were reformed as individual ridings.
 Richelieu and Verchères, which formed Richelieu-Verchères returned as individual ridings.
 Kamouraska and Rivière-du-Loup which formed Kamouraska-Rivière-du-Loup returned as individual ridings.

References
 1939 election results
 List of Historical Cabinet Ministers

21